Longhedge Railway Works was a locomotive and carriage works built by the London, Chatham and Dover Railway in the borough of Battersea, South London to serve their new London terminus at Victoria. The facility existed between 1862 until the mid-1950s.

History

Construction
In 1860 the directors of the London, Chatham and Dover Railway decided to purchase  of land, formerly part of the Long Hedge farm in Battersea, to establish their new locomotive works and motive power depot. The site was on the south side of the London and South Western Railway main line at Stewarts Lane. By February 1862 an erecting shop for twelve locomotives, and a running shed for 26 locomotives had been completed, and by the end of the year a carriage works was also completed on the site. Further extensions were made in 1875/6 and 1880/1.

Activities
The new works was initially used by the locomotive superintendent William Martley for the repair and rebuilding of the existing locomotive stock, with new locomotives obtained from outside contractors. However, in 1869 he began the construction of three new Enigma class 2-4-0 locomotives there. However, it was not until the appointment of William Kirtley as locomotive superintendent in 1876 that the works were again used for new construction with further examples of Martley's Europa class 2-4-0 locomotives, Kirtley's own T class 0-6-0T and his M1, M2 and M3 class 4-4-0 express passenger locomotives. Following Kirtley's retirement in 1898 on the formation of the South Eastern and Chatham Railway, Ashford became the major locomotive works for the new company, but the new Locomotive, Carriage & Wagon Superintendent H. S. Wainwright used Longhedge works for the construction of some examples of his SECR C class 0-6-0 freight locomotives in 1902–04. Thereafter the works was used for heavy repairs until 1911, when much of the equipment and machinery was transferred to Ashford, leaving only the capacity to undertake light repairs associated with the adjoining Stewarts Lane motive power depot.

The site today
After the creation of the Southern Railway in 1923, the nearby Battersea depot of the London, Brighton and South Coast Railway was closed and Stewarts Lane grew to become the largest steam motive power depot of the system. Most of the buildings of Longhedge works were demolished in 1957 to make way for a new depot for servicing electric trains. The site is now occupied by the Stewarts Lane Traction Maintenance Depot.

References
 Bradley, D.L., (1979) The locomotive history of the London Chatham and Dover Railway, Railway Correspondence & Travel Society

Railway workshops in Great Britain
London, Chatham and Dover Railway
History of rail transport in London
Transport in the London Borough of Wandsworth
Buildings and structures in Battersea
1862 establishments in England